Epilobium oregonense is a species of flowering plant in the evening primrose family known by the common name Oregon willowherb. It is native to western North America from British Columbia to Arizona, where it generally grows in moist places in several types of habitat. It is a perennial herb growing spindly erect stems approaching 40 centimeters high or sometimes forming mats spreading via stolons. The small leaves are rounded near the base of the plant and linear in shape farther up the stem. The inflorescence bears flowers with four white to pink petals each a few millimeters long. The fruit is an elongated capsule up to 5 centimeters in length which is borne on a long pedicel which may be longer than the capsule itself.

References

External links
Jepson Manual Treatment
Photo gallery

oregonense
Flora of Arizona
Flora of British Columbia
Flora of Oregon
Flora without expected TNC conservation status